Events from the year 1904 in Sweden

Incumbents
 Monarch – Oscar II
 Prime Minister – Erik Gustaf Boström

Events

 10 January - The Swedish Antarctic Expedition returns to Stockholm.
 18 December – The Swedish Football Association is founded in Stockholm.
 Date unknown – First issue of Morgonbris.
 Date unknown – From this year until 1909, co-education is introduced in a number of state secondary education schools, which makes private girls schools redundant.

Births

 4 January - Hjördis Töpel, Olympic diver and swimmer
 13 January - Ewa Olliwier, Olympic diver
 18 January - John Axel Nannfeldt, botanist and mycologist
 24 January - Wivan Pettersson, Olympic swimmer
 29 February - Helmer Grundström, writer
 31 March - Harald Berglund, cinematographer
 1 April - Holger Löwenadler, film actor
 2 April - Karl Ragnar Gierow, theater director, author and translator
 8 April - Georg Werner, Olympic freestyle swimmer
 6 May - Harry Martinson, writer, recipient of the Nobel Prize in Literature
 22 May - Uno Lamm (born August Uno Lamm), electrical engineer and inventor
 2 July - Erik Lundin, chess master
 19 July - Vera Schmiterlöw, film actress

Deaths
 19 April - Hanna Styrell, actress and royal mistress (born 1842)
 29 May - Maria Paulina Åhman, harpist (born 1812)
 11 June - Clas Theodor Odhner, historian (born 1836)
 15 October - Anna Stecksén, scientist (born 1870)

References

 
Years of the 20th century in Sweden
Sweden